Jaanwar or Janwar may refer to:

 Janwar (1965 film)
 Jaanwar (1983 film)
 Jaanwar (1999 film)
 Jaanwar (2021 film)

See also 
 Janwar Aur Insaan, a 1972 film